Marques Barrett Houston (born August 4, 1981) is an American R&B singer, songwriter, dancer, model and actor. A member of the R&B group Immature/IMx from 1990 until 2002, Houston went solo in 2003. As an actor, he is best known for his role as Roger Evans in the television comedy Sister, Sister. As a solo artist, Houston has released 
a number of successful studio albums that went platinum in the United States.

Early life 
Houston was born on August 4, 1981, in Los Angeles, California, to Michael and Carolyn Houston. He is the older cousin of B2K's J-Boog. Houston began acting at an early age.

Music career

Music beginnings 
In 1992, Houston became a founding member of the R&B group Immature (also known as IMx). The members of the group include Jerome "Romeo" Jones and Don "Half Pint" Santos (later replaced by Kelton "LDB" Kessee), along with Chris Stokes, who is their manager. During this period, Houston went by the nickname "Batman". In 1999, the group underwent a name change, releasing two albums under the name IMx: Introducing IMx (1999) and IMx (2001). The group also branched out into acting and appeared on shows such as A Different World and Sister, Sister. They recorded songs for soundtracks to the films House Party 3 and House Party 4: Down to the Last Minute, before disbanding in 2002.

2003–2005: MH and Naked 
In 2003, Houston began pursuing a solo career. Using his birth name, Marques Houston, he released his debut album, MH, on October 21, 2003. The album featured the singles "That Girl", "Clubbin'" (featuring Joe Budden and R. Kelly), "Pop That Booty" (featuring Jermaine Dupri) and "Because of You". In the United States charts, MH peaked at number 20 on the Billboard 200 and at number 5 on Billboards Top R&B/Hip-Hop Albums. On May 24, 2005, Houston released his second solo album, Naked. The album featured the singles "All Because of You" (featuring Young Rome), "Naked" and "Sex Wit You". In the United States, Naked peaked at number 13 on the Billboard and peaked at number 5 on Billboard Top R&B/Hip-Hop Albums.

2006–2008: Veteran 
Houston released his third solo album, Veteran, on March 20, 2007. The album featured the singles "Like This" (featuring Yung Joc), "Favorite Girl", "Circle" and "Wonderful". In the United States, Veteran debuted (and peaked) at number 5 on the Billboard 200 and debuted at number 1 on Billboards Top R&B/Hip-Hop Albums, marking this release as Houston's first number-one solo album.

2009–2011: Mr. Houston, Mattress Music and IMx reunion 
Houston released his fourth solo album, Mr. Houston on September 29, 2009. It featured the singles, "I Love Her" and "Sunset". Videos for the album tracks "Body" and "Date" were released online by the singer in 2008. "How I Do" and "Case of You" received video premieres in 2009, followed by a video for "Tonight" in 2010. On September 14, 2010, Houston released his fifth studio album, Mattress Music, which contained the singles "Kickin' & Screamin'" and "Pullin' On Her Hair". A video for a third single, "Ghetto Angel" premiered in 2011. Houston announced on 106 & Park that IMx planned to record another group album together that year. This plan was eventually scrapped.

2012–2013: Famous 
In October 2012, Houston announced a new studio album, Famous, was slated for release on August 27. Marques released the song "Speechless" as a promotional preview via free digital download. The first single off the album, made available on iTunes, was "Give Your Love a Try" featuring Problem.

2014–present: White Party, soundtracks and Me 
Following the release of his previous album, Houston reunited with IMx and did some touring. Changing their name back to Immature, the band released a new single called "Let Me Find Out" in late 2014. Their comeback EP titled Remember was released in early 2015. Later that year, Houston released the solo single "Need You" from the soundtrack of his film Will to Love.

In 2016, Houston released a new single "Complete Me" to digital/streaming outlets. He premiered a music video for the song in September. The track was slated to be the first single off his album White Party, set for release later that year. However, this album never materialized. In 2017, Houston recorded a trio of new songs for the film 'Til Death Do Us Part, for which he wrote the screenplay. His song "Together" was released as a single from the soundtrack.

After nine years, Houston released a new album titled Me on February 4, 2022. His follow up EP, Me: Dark Water, was released on November 4, 2022.

Acting career 
Houston made his acting debut in the animated comedy film Bébé's Kids (1992) in which he was the voice of Khalil, the leader and oldest child of the titular "Bébé's Kids". Houston later appeared in House Party 3 (1994), where he played a fictional version of himself along with fellow Immature bandmates Jerome "Romeo" Jones and Don "Half Pint" Santos. In the film, they portrayed Kid's trouble-making younger cousins who aspire to become musicians. Houston's breakthrough role came when he won the part of Roger Evans in the television comedy show Sister, Sister, playing the next-door neighbor of identical twin sisters Tia Landry and Tamera Campbell (Tia and Tamera Mowry). Marques played the role for five of the show's six seasons. The show wrote his character out of the script during the fifth season, but he made a guest appearance in the series finale. In 1997, he had a brief cameo in the movie "Good Burger", a spin-off from a sketch on the Nickelodeon show "All That" starring Kenan Thompson and Kel Mitchell. He played Jake, Kenan's friend. Houston and his IMx (formerly Immature) band members made an appearance in Destiny's Child's music video for the single "No, No, No Part 1" off their 1998 self-titled debut album. In 2000, shortly after Houston's run on Sister, Sister ended, Marques had a brief cameo in Destiny's Child's video rendition of The Writing's on the Wall single "Jumpin', Jumpin'" directed by Joseph Kahn.

He also played the character Elgin Barrett Eugene Smith III in the 2004 film You Got Served. Following You Got Served, in both live-action and voice-over, he portrayed Dumb Donald in the film adaptation of Fat Albert, based on Bill Cosby's popular cartoon series Fat Albert and the Cosby Kids. From 2005 to 2006, Houston starred as Kevin Barnes in his own television series, Cuts, which was a spin-off of One on One. Despite good ratings, the show only lasted two seasons due to UPN merging with The WB to become The CW which caused Cuts along with many other UPN shows to get cancelled. In 2007, Houston starred in the horror film Somebody Help Me. He then starred in the sequel, Somebody Help Me 2, in 2010. In 2012, Houston starred in a kids hip hop dance battle film, Battlefield America. He portrayed Sean Lewis, an ad executive who serves as a dance teacher after receiving a sentence of community service; however, he does not dance in the film. He also starred in 2016's A Weekend With The Family, alongside Karrueche Tran. In 2015, Houston reunited with Sister, Sister co-star Tamera Mowry on the daytime talk show The Real (also with Tia Mowry in 2017) for two episodes. He later reunited with his IMx bandmates for a brief storyline appearance on Love & Hip Hop: Hollywood in 2019.

Film producing career 
Houston began his journey into the behind the scenes world of filmmaking in 2010, partnering with longtime music manager Chris Stokes, who directed most of the films he wrote and produced.

Houston is currently the CEO of a film production company, Footage Films, in California, along with fellow IMx bandmate Young Rome (Jerome Jones) as president and relative Jarell Houston, (J-Boog of B2K) as vice president. Chris Stokes is the chairman of the board and directs the majority of the productions. Marques serves as an executive producer and writer. The majority of the films are mostly made-for-TV features. Following in the paths of filmmakers John Waters, John Singleton and Spike Lee's casting tradition, Houston and Stokes often cast some of their actors more than once in different films portraying different roles. His first full writing and executive producer credit was the 2015 film Will to Love, starring Keisha Knight Pulliam, Draya Michele, and himself, respectively.

He produced a thriller, Running Out of Time, starring Tasha Smith, RonReaco Lee and Telma Hopkins, that aired in December 2018 on BET. Since the start of this new career, he has written and produced over ten films so far, including one he co-wrote with Stokes that was released to theaters in 2017, titled 'Til Death Do Us Part starring Taye Diggs, Stephen Bishop, Annie Ilonzeh and Malik Yoba. Houston produced, wrote and starred in a thriller film alongside Love and Hip Hop star Erica Mena titled "The Stepmother" which premiered on Tubi in June 2022. A sequel was announced in November 2022.

Personal life 
Houston's mother died from lymphoma in 1997. He became a Jehovah's Witness in 2016. Marques welcomed his first daughter, Zara Houston, on December 2, 2021, with his wife Miya Houston.

Relationships 
Houston previously dated singer Jamila "Mila J" Chilombo and My Wife and Kids actress Jennifer Freeman, with whom he had starred in the 2004 film You Got Served. Rumors surfaced in November 2007 that Freeman and Houston had gotten engaged, but they broke up a few months later.

He began a relationship with Marlena Campbell in 2008. Houston confirmed their relationship publicly in March 2010, celebrating their second anniversary on his Twitter page. The couple reportedly split in 2015.

In March 2019, Houston became engaged to Miya Dickey, whom he met and began dating in 2018. They married in Corona, California on August 24, 2020, and have a 19-year age difference.

Discography 

Studio albums
 MH (2003)
 Naked (2005)
 Veteran (2007)
 Mr. Houston (2009)
 Mattress Music (2010)
 Famous (2013)
 Me (2022)

Filmography

Television

Film

As producer

Awards and nominations

References

External links 

 

1981 births
American hip hop singers
American male child actors
American male television actors
American male film actors
IMx members
Living people
Singers from Los Angeles
American contemporary R&B singers
American Jehovah's Witnesses
Converts to Jehovah's Witnesses
Universal Motown Records artists
21st-century African-American male singers